Michael Bruce Quigley (born October 17, 1958) is an American politician serving as the U.S. representative for  since the April 7, 2009 special election. The district includes most of Chicago's North Side and several of its western suburbs. He is a member of the Democratic Party. Quigley is a former member of the Cook County Board of Commissioners, where he represented Chicago's northside neighborhoods of Lakeview, Uptown, and Rogers Park. He previously taught environmental policy and Chicago politics as an adjunct professor at Loyola University Chicago.

Chicago Sun-Times political writer Fran Spielman has described Quigley as, "a political centrist with a progressive bent."

Early life, education, and early political career
Quigley was raised in Carol Stream, Illinois, where he graduated from Glenbard North High School in 1977. He then attended Roosevelt University, where he earned his bachelor's degree. Quigley moved into the Lakeview area of Chicago in 1982, and became involved in community activities. He attended the Loyola University Chicago School of Law, where he earned a Juris Doctor degree, and the University of Chicago, where he earned a master's degree in public policy.

The start of Quigley's political career saw him serve as a chief aide to Chicago Alderman Bernie Hansen.

Cook County Board of Commissioners 
Quigley was first elected to the Cook County Board of Commissioners in 1998, succeeding Maria Pappas, who was elected Cook County Treasurer. During his tenure, he gained a reputation as a reformer, opposing tax hikes supported by Cook County Board President John Stroger and later his son and successor Todd Stroger. Quigley contended the county could operate more efficiently, and presented reports to support his position. He also challenged the practice of finding jobs for Democratic officials with the Cook County Forest Preserve District.

U.S. House of Representatives

Elections
2009

In early 2009, incumbent U.S. Representative Rahm Emanuel of  resigned to become White House Chief of Staff to newly elected President Barack Obama. The congressional vacancy was filled via the special election. Quigley was one of 12 candidates to file in the Democratic primary—the real contest in this heavily Democratic district. He was endorsed by the Chicago Sun-Times, which called him "a constant advocate for fiscal responsibility and a watchdog against waste and corruption". He was also endorsed by the Chicago Tribune, which cited Quigley's efforts to improve county government, noting, "If Quigley's ideas had all been put in place, the county would not be crying now for more money". He won the March special primary with 22% of the vote. The second-place candidate, State Representative John Fritchey, received 18%. After the primary, Quigley won the April special election with 69% of the vote over Republican challenger Rosanna Pulido. The district and its predecessors have been in Democratic hands for all but three years since 1909.

2010

Quigley won reelection to his first full term in 2010 with 71% of the vote.

2012

After redistricting, Quigley's district was pushed into DuPage County. The new district absorbed the home of 13th district Republican Congresswoman Judy Biggert. But Biggert opted to run in the 11th district, the successor to the old 13th. The old 5th is only slightly less Democratic than its predecessor; Obama won the district in 2008 with 70% (down three points from the old 5th), and 2010 Democratic U.S. Senate nominee Alexi Giannoulias carried it with 55% of the vote. No Democrat filed to run against him. Only one Republican filed, self-employed businessman Dan Schmitt.

Tenure
On July 12, 2017, Quigley introduced H. R. 2884, "The Communications Over Various Feeds Electronically for Engagement Act (COVFEFE Act)". The bill would require the National Archives to preserve and store social media posts by the President of the United States. It was referred to the House Committee on Oversight and Government Reform on the same day, yet saw no further congressional action.

Gun control
In May 2011, Quigley sponsored an amendment to the Patriot Act prohibiting the sale of weapons to people on the FBI's Terrorist Watch List. He believed that the Republican limitation of civil liberties under the Patriot Act contradicted their unwillingness to limit Second Amendment rights. This bill, proposed as an amendment to the Patriot Act, came under fire from Representatives James Sensenbrenner Jr. and Louie Gohmert, who argued that it would infringe on the Second Amendment rights of those mistakenly placed on the Terrorist Watch List. The bill failed on a party-line House Judiciary panel vote, 21–11.

Public health
Quigley has received a rating of 100 (on a scale of 1 to 100) from the American Public Health Association, indicating his strong support of healthcare legislation. In April 2011, he voted against Paul Ryan's budget plan (which involved budget cuts to Medicare, as well as decreased government funding to help citizens procure health insurance). Also in April 2011, Quigley voted against repealing the "Prevention and Public Health" fund, a fund focused on Community and Clinical Prevention of chronic diseases, as well as allotting money towards health-care infrastructure and research. He also voted for increases in government spending on physical and occupational therapy.

In March 2021, Quigley announced his support for the Medicare for All Act of 2021 introduced by Pramila Jayapal and Debbie Dingell.

Environment
A Sierra Club member since high school, Quigley initially joined politics because of his desire to help the environment through legislation. He has enacted this desire through supporting the American Clean Energy and Security Act, a 2009 bill to create an emissions trading plan which passed in the House of Representatives, but was defeated in the Senate. Quigley also introduced the Federal Birdsafe Buildings Bill, a 2011 initiative to make all buildings built by the General Services Administration built with the maximum amount of bird-safe materials and features. In April 2011, he voted to prohibit invasive research on great apes.

Veterans
Quigley supports veterans' benefits, and has worked to improve healthcare and education opportunities for them. His district office is also known to make services available to veterans whenever they need it, such as helping one veteran receive medals that he had been waiting over 20 years to receive. In 2013, Quigley introduced a bill to the House to prevent veterans from entering into debt to pay for tuition before GI benefits are received. His hope was to provide greater educational opportunities to veterans with this bill.

Abortion
Quigley supports reproductive rights, and voted against banning federal health coverage for abortions. He also supports federal funding for family planning and sex education, as well as creating more preventive steps to avoid unwanted pregnancies altogether.

LGBTQ rights
Quigley supports LGBTQ rights, and showed his support in 2012 by participating in National Coming Out Day as a show of solidarity. He has called for the FDA to revoke its ban on allowing blood donations from gay and bisexual men.

In September 2014, Quigley was one of 69 members of Congress to sign a letter to then-FDA commissioner Sylvia Burwell requesting that the FDA revise its policy banning donation of corneas and other tissues by men who have had sex with another man in the preceding five years.

Committee assignments

116th Congress
Committee on Appropriations
Subcommittee on Financial Services and General Government (Chair)
Subcommittee on Transportation, Housing and Urban Development, and Related Agencies
Permanent Select Committee on Intelligence
Subcommittee on Counterterrorism, Counterintelligence and Counterproliferation
Subcommittee on Strategic Technologies and Advanced Research

115th Congress
Appropriations Committee
Subcommittee on Financial Services and General Government (FSGG)
Subcommittee on Transportation, Housing and Urban Development, and Related Agencies (THUD)
Intelligence Committee
Subcommittee on Emerging Threats
Subcommittee on the NSA and Cybersecurity

114th Congress
Intelligence Committee

113th Congress
Appropriations Committee
Subcommittee on Financial Services and General Government
Subcommittee on Transportation, Housing and Urban Development, and Related Agencies

112th Congress
Committee on the Judiciary
Subcommittee on Crime, Terrorism, and Homeland Security
Subcommittee on the Constitution
Committee on Oversight and Government Reform
Subcommittee on TARP, Financial Services and Bailouts of Public and Private Programs (Ranking Member)
Subcommittee on National Security, Homeland Defense and Foreign Operations

Caucus memberships

Congressional Arts Caucus
Congressional Transparency Caucus
New Democrat Coalition
United States Congressional International Conservation Caucus
U.S.-Japan Caucus
Veterinary Medicine Caucus

Other political activities
Quigley considered running for mayor of Chicago in 2019, after Rahm Emanuel indicated he would not seek reelection, but ultimately did not. In early 2022, it was reported that Quigley was considering a run for mayor in 2023. In April 2022, he announced he would not enter the race, and subsequently endorsed U.S. Representative Chuy Garcia's campaign.

Electoral history

Cook County Board of Commissioners
1998

2002

2006

Congressional
2009 (special)

2010

2012

2014

2016

2018

2020

2022

Awards and recognition
In 2009, Quigley was inducted into the Chicago Gay and Lesbian Hall of Fame as a Friend of the Community.

Personal life 
Quigley and his wife Barbara have two daughters, Alyson and Meghan.

References

External links

U.S. Congressman Mike Quigley official U.S. House website
Mike Quigley for Congress 
Congressional Transparency Caucus

|-

1958 births
21st-century American politicians
Democratic Party members of the United States House of Representatives from Illinois
Illinois lawyers
Living people
Loyola University Chicago faculty
Loyola University Chicago School of Law alumni
Members of the Cook County Board of Commissioners
Politicians from Chicago
Roosevelt University alumni
University of Chicago alumni